A molecular glue is a small molecule that stabilizes the interaction between two proteins that do not normally interact.

The most commonly employed molecular glue induces a novel interaction between a substrate receptor of an E3 ubiquitin ligase and a target protein leading to proteolysis of the target. Examples of molecular glues that induce degradation of protein targets include the immunomodulatory imide drug (also known as IMiD; e.g., thalidomide, lenalidomide, pomalidomide), which generate a novel interaction between a substrate (e.g., IKZF1/3, also known as Ikaros/Aiolos) and cereblon, a substrate receptor (also known as DCAF) for Cullin-RING ubiquitin ligase 4 (CRL4). They work in a similar manner to PROTAC molecules, bringing about targeted protein degradation. Distinct from PROTAC molecules, molecular glues insert into a naturally occurring PPI interface, with contacts optimized for both the substrate and ligase within the same small molecule entity.

The phrase "molecular glue" was coined in 1992 by Stuart Schreiber in reference to the immunophilins.

References 

Medicinal chemistry
Biotechnology